Harrison Island is private farming island in Montgomery County, Maryland, United States. It is located between the Potomac River on the Maryland side, and Ball's Bluff Battlefield and National Cemetery on the Virginia side, next to Leesburg, Virginia. The island dominates the view from the heights of Ball's Bluff Battlefield. Among the low, flood-prone islands of the lower Potomac River, Harrison Island is notable for having a permanent private residence visible near the center of the island. There are no bridges to the island. Currently the island is closed to the general public.

References

River islands of Maryland
Landforms of Montgomery County, Maryland
Islands of the Potomac River